Har Ghar Kuch Kehta Hai is a Hindi television serial that aired on Zee TV from 16 July 2007 – 18 April 2008. It was based on the story of 3 girls: Prarthna, Sidhhi, and Sanskriti. Even though they all have different lives and a different outlook of life, destiny is not always on their side, and when the unexpected happens their dreams, hopes and desires come crashing down.

Concept
First, the story focuses on the lives and different belief systems of the three main protagonists - Prarthana, Siddhi and Sanskriti.

Prarthana (Rati Pandey) is an orphan nurtured by her uncle and aunt. Her only desire is to have a traditional arranged marriage into a happy joint family. Prarthana hopes that one day she will walk into a house that is full of warmth and love.

Prarthana's cousin Siddhi (Aanchal Anand) is a vibrant and independent girl who has lived abroad most of her life. Siddhi cannot understand the concept of an arranged marriage, nor can she tolerate being surrounded by people all the time. She believes that one must marry one's true love.

Sanskriti (Amrita Prakash) is a model by profession, very straightforward and blunt in her attitude. Sanskriti can't understand the concept of marriage at all. She doesn’t believe that marriage can hold two people closer than love can. She vouches for a live-in relationship.

Cast
 Rati Pandey as Prarthana Singh / Prarthana Akshay Thakral
 Aanchal Anand as Siddhi Gyan Kapoor
 Amrita Prakash as Sanskriti Thakral
 Vineet Raina as Akshay Thakral
 Nasirr Khan as Vishal Thakral
 Puneet Sachdev as Rajeev
 Rio Kapadia as Ranveer (Rio) Thakral
 Meghna Malik as Swarna (Su) Ranveer Thakral
 Yash Sinha as Prem Thakral
 Shabnam Sayed as Tarana Vishal Thakral
 Ridheema Tiwari as Shalini Prem Thakral
 Sachin Shroff as Gyan Kapoor
 Alok Nath as Baldev Kapoor
 Niyati Joshi as Mrs. Kapoor, Baldev's wife & Gyan's mother 
 Hemant Choudhary as Khan Chacha
 Nigaar Khan as Mohini
 Rocky Verma as Tapori-Gunda
 Piyush Sahdev as Varun
 Shweta Gautam as Gyan's Aunt
 Yusuf Hussain as Mr. Singh
 Vineeta Malik as Mrs. Singh
 Shivani Gosain as Renuka Alok Singh
 Sonali Naik as Mrs. Ashok Singh

Re launching and branding
The serial was re launched with new episodes on 7 September 2013 on Colors channel. It was produced by the Indian division of BBC Worldwide and featured homes of such celebrities as Govinda, Waheeda Rehman, Irfan Pathan, Sakshi Tanwar and Ila Arun among others. The new show also introduces the viewer to a new host, Vinay Pathak.

In 2014 Asian Paints released a commercial which was focused on the joys of homemaking in the world of Har Ghar Kuch Kehta Hai. The 22 seconds long commercial episodes were produced by Ogilvy India agency in partnership with Bang in the Middle.

Following the commercials, it revealed by Sony Entertainment that they bought the rights on airing the first season of the serial on their own TV channel, with second and third seasons released in 2015.

References

External links

Official Site
Har Ghar Kuch Kehta Hai-Writer's Page

2007 Indian television series debuts
2008 Indian television series endings
Indian television soap operas
Zee TV original programming